, abbreviated as RS, was a video game production company that was founded on February 27, 1990, in Nishi-Ōi, Shinagawa, Tokyo, Japan.

Games

 Alshark
 PC-98 version ( May 24, 1991 / Publisher: Right Stuff )
 X68000 edition ( November 15, 1991 / Publisher: Right Stuff )
 FM TOWNS edition ( May 28, 1993 / Publisher: Right Stuff )
 Mega-CD/Sega-CD edition ( November 26, 1993 / Publishers: Polydor, Sand Storm )
 PC Engine CD-ROM ² version ( August 26, 1994 / Publisher: Victor Entertainment )
 Terraforming (fully titled Syd Mead's Terraforming) ( CD-ROM ² / May 1, 1992 )
 Tirambaram (fully titled Libros de Tirambaram) ( PC-98 / November 7, 1992 / Publisher: Right Stuff )
 Fiend Hunter ( CD-ROM ² / Jan 29, 1993 / Publisher: Right Stuff )
 Sword Master ( CD-ROM ² / November 19, 1993 / Publisher: Right Stuff )
 Flash Hiders ( CD-ROM ² / December 19, 1993 / Publisher: Right Stuff )
 Emerald Dragon ( CD-ROM ² / January 28, 1994 / Publisher: NEC Home Electronics ) - Co-production
 Revery: Izanai no Masuishō ( PC-98 / March 10, 1994 / Publisher: Right Stuff )
 Foresight Dolly ( PC-98 / 1994-1999 / Publisher: Right Stuff )
 Alnam no Kiba: Shouzoku Juunishin-to Densetsu
 PC Engine version ( December 22, 1994 / Publisher: Right Stuff )
 PlayStation edition ( February 2, 1996 / Publisher: Right Stuff )
 Dungeon Hack
 Japanese version of PC-9821 version ( March 31, 1995 )
 Japanese version of PC-98 version ( July 7, 1995 )
 THE TV SHOW!! ( CD-ROM ² / September 29, 1995 )
 Battle Tycoon: Flash Hiders SFX ( Super Famicom / May 19, 1995 / Publisher: Right Stuff )
 Jockey Zero ( PlayStation / November 1, 1996 / Publisher: Right Stuff )
 Blue Forest Story: Kaze no Fuuin
 3DO version ( April 26, 1996 )
 PlayStation edition ( December 6, 1996 )
 Alnam no Tsubasa: Shouchiri no Sora no Achira e (PlayStation / 1997, December 15 / Release: Right Stuff )
 Himitsu Kessha Q (PlayStation / 1998 July 30 / Release: Right Stuff )

Other
A newsletter titled "RSのどいつもこいつも!!" was issued.

References

External links
Official Right Stuff websites at Internet Archive  (In 2000 and later, another independent company domain name is acquired.)
 Right Stuff at Game Set Watch

 
Defunct video game companies of Japan
Video game companies established in 1990
Japanese companies established in 1990